Qezelabad (also Romanized as Qezelābād) is a village in Mofatteh Rural District, in the Central District of Famenin County, Hamadan Province, Iran. At the 2006 census, its population was 1,102, in 252 families.

References 

Populated places in Famenin County